The Pike River is an  stream in Houghton County in the U.S. state of Michigan.

The North Branch Otter River empties into the Otter River, which turns to the northeast into Otter Lake and then feeds the Sturgeon River.

References 

Rivers of Michigan
Rivers of Houghton County, Michigan
Tributaries of Lake Superior